Stanislav Ivanovych Hurenko (30 May 1936 – 14 April 2013), was a Soviet Ukrainian politician and member of the Soviet Communist Party.

Mikhail Gorbachev brought in his ally Hurenko in to replace Vladimir Ivashko as First Secretary of the Ukrainian Communist Party on 23 June 1990. He resigned his position as First Secretary on 30 August 1991 , when the failure of the August putsch in Moscow, the activities of the Communist Party of Ukraine were banned.

Then he served as the member of Verkhovna Rada.

Hurenko retired and died on 14 April 2013, at the age of 76 after suffering from cancer.

References

1936 births
2013 deaths
People from Ilovaisk
Kyiv Polytechnic Institute alumni
Institute of Industrial Economics (NANU) alumni
Academic staff of Donetsk National Technical University
Ukrainian atheists
Politburo of the Central Committee of the Communist Party of the Soviet Union members
Politburo of the Central Committee of the Communist Party of Ukraine (Soviet Union) members
Communist Party of Ukraine politicians
Members of the Congress of People's Deputies of the Soviet Union
First convocation members of the Verkhovna Rada
Third convocation members of the Verkhovna Rada
Fourth convocation members of the Verkhovna Rada
Tenth convocation members of the Verkhovna Rada of the Ukrainian Soviet Socialist Republic
Eleventh convocation members of the Verkhovna Rada of the Ukrainian Soviet Socialist Republic
First Secretaries of the Communist Party of Ukraine (Soviet Union)
Recipients of the Order of the Red Banner of Labour
Deaths from cancer in Ukraine